Irura mandarina, also known as the Goldenback jumping spider, is a species of jumping spider found in China, Vietnam and India.

References 

Spiders described in 1903
Salticidae
Spiders of Asia